Justin Jacob Florek (born May 18, 1990) is an American professional ice hockey player. He is currently playing with the South Carolina Stingrays of the ECHL. Florek was selected by the Boston Bruins in the 5th round (135th overall) of the 2010 NHL Entry Draft.

Playing career
Florek played junior hockey for the USA Hockey National Team Development Program for both the under-17 and under-18 teams before moving on to the Northern Michigan University Wildcats ice hockey program. While at Northern Michigan, Florek played 157 games, scoring 53 goals and 63 assists for 116 points. Florek was named an alternate captain of the team for the 2010–11 season and captain for the 2011–12 season.
During his collegiate career, he led NMU in game winning goals in the 2009–10, 2010–11 and 2011–12 season, and led the team in power play goals with nine during the 2011–12 season. Florek was named to the CCHA Second All-Star team and was named a finalist for the CCHA Best Defensive Forward Award for the 2011–12 season.

Following his final season with the Wildcats, Florek signed an entry level contract with the Bruins on March 25, 2012, and was assigned to the Providence Bruins of the AHL for the rest of the season.

Florek attended the Boston Bruins training camp prior to the 2012–13 NHL season, but was assigned to Providence on September 14, 2012. Florek played 71 games with Providence scoring 11 goals and 16 assists for 27 points in the regular season and played 12 playoff games scoring one goal and two assists for three points before they were eliminated in the conference finals by the Wilkes-Barre/Scranton Penguins.

On September 22, 2013, Florek was again assigned to Providence to begin the 2013–14, but played in four NHL games for Boston during the 2013–14 regular season. On January 4, 2014 Florek made his NHL debut, playing for the Bruins in a 4–1 win against the Winnipeg Jets. Florek was reassigned to Providence again on January 5, 2014. Florek scored his first NHL goal on January 9, 2014, against Jonathan Quick of the Los Angeles Kings, in a game the Bruins lost 4-2 to the Kings.

On April 20, 2014, Florek scored his first NHL playoff goal during the opening round of the 2014 Stanley Cup Playoffs, as Boston defeated the visiting Detroit Red Wings 4–1 in the second game of the series.

Florek attended the Bruins training camp for the start of the 2014-2015 NHL Season but was assigned to Providence on October 1, 2014.

On July 2, 2015, Florek left the Bruins as a free agent to sign a one-year, two-way contract with the New York Islanders. He was assigned to AHL affiliate, the Bridgeport Sound Tigers for the duration of the 2015–16 season. He appeared in every game with the Sound Tigers, producing a career low 16 points.

As an unsigned free agent over the summer, Florek was unable to attract NHL interest. On October 8, 2016, he signed a one-year AHL contract with the Milwaukee Admirals, affiliate to the Nashville Predators. In the 2016–17 season, Florek contributed with 12 goals and 30 points in 75 games for the Admirals.

On May 19, 2017, as a free agent, he inked a one-year deal with his first European club, the Iserlohn Roosters of the German top-tier Deutsche Eishockey Liga (DEL).

Following two seasons with the Roosters, serving as captain in the 2018–19 campaign, Florek left the club to sign a one-year contract with the EHC Black Wings Linz in the neighbouring Austrian Hockey League (EBEL), on May 14, 2019.

After three seasons in Europe, Florek as a free agent opted to return to North America by agreeing to a contract with the South Carolina Stingrays of the ECHL on September 3, 2020.

Career statistics

Regular season and playoffs

International

Awards and honors

References

External links

1990 births
American men's ice hockey left wingers
EHC Black Wings Linz players
Boston Bruins draft picks
Boston Bruins players
Bridgeport Sound Tigers players
Iserlohn Roosters players
Living people
Milwaukee Admirals players
Northern Michigan Wildcats men's ice hockey players
People from Marquette, Michigan
Providence Bruins players
South Carolina Stingrays players